Orphanage Polytechnic College  is an Indian self-financing Technical education institution established in 2015 under the aegis of the 'Edavanna Yatheemkhana Committee. The college is located in Edavanna,  in the Malappuram district of Kerala. The college is affiliated with the Department of Technical Education Kerala and approved by the All India Council for Technical Education, New Delhi.

The college offers diploma courses in civil engineering, mechanical engineering, automobile engineering, electrical and electronic engineering.

External links 

Engineering colleges in Kerala
Universities and colleges in Malappuram district
Educational institutions established in 2015
2015 establishments in Kerala